Ivanovsky is a rural locality (a settlement) in Ufa, Bashkortostan, Russia. The population was 123 as of 2010. There are 2 streets.

Geography 
Ivanovsky is located 26 km northeast of Ufa. Novye Cherkassy is the nearest rural locality.

References 

Rural localities in Ufa urban okrug